Van Swinden may refer to:

 Jean Henri van Swinden (1746–1823), a Dutch mathematician 
 10440 van Swinden, a minor planet